Mamayev or Mamaev is a Slavic masculine surname originating from the Turkic name Mamai, its feminine counterpart is Mamayeva or Mamaeva. It may refer to
Danil Mamayev (born 1994), Russian ice hockey player
Eldar Mamayev (born 1985), Russian football player
Nursultan Mamayev (born 1993), Kazakhstani taekwondo practitioner
Oleg Mamayev (1925–1994), Russian oceanographer
Pavel Mamayev (born 1988), Russian football player
Yuri Mamaev (born 1984), Russian football midfielder

See also
Mamayev Kurgan, a hill in Volgograd, Russia, named after Mamai